Alexey Fyodorovich Maslov (23 September 1953 – 25 December 2022) was a Russian General of the Army who served as Commander-in-Chief of the Russian Ground Forces. He was a graduate of the Tank Troops Military Academy and in the Military Academy of the General Staff of the Russian Armed Forces.

Biography
Born on 23 September 1953 in Panskoye, Kursk region, Alexey Maslov was educated at the Kharkiv Higher Tank Command School. His first service tours were in the Carpathian Military District, where he served as tank platoon, company, and battalion commander. In 1984, he earned a degree at the Tank Academy and was appointed regiment commander (1986) and, later, deputy division commander within the Central Group of Forces in Czechoslovakia. From 1990 to 1994, General Maslov served as deputy division commander, Volga-Ural Military District and, in 1994, assumed command of 15th Guards 'Mozyr' Tank Division, at Chebarkul within the same district.

In 1998, General Maslov graduated from the General Staff Academy and took up the post as deputy commander for training, within the then Transbaikal Military District.

In 1999, he became Chief of Combat Training in the Siberian Military District. In March 2000, he was appointed chief of staff and first deputy army commander of 36th Combined Arms Army within the Siberian Military District.

From June 2001 to 2003, General Maslov served as commander of 57th Army Corps in the Siberian Military District.  On 22 March 2003 he was appointed chief of staff & First Deputy Commander, North Caucasus Military District. He later became First Deputy Commander and Chief of Staff of the Ground Forces.

By a Presidential Decree of 5 November 2004 Alexey Maslov assumed the duties of Ground Forces Commander-in-Chief, succeeding General Nikolai Kormiltsev. As Commander-in-Chief, he started to increase the number of contract soldiers in the Russian Ground Forces. He was promoted to the rank of General of the Army on 15 December 2006.

In August 2008, he stepped down from the position of the Commander-in-Chief of the Russian Ground Forces, then moved to the Russian Military Representative to NATO. He was replaced by General of the Army Vladimir Boldyrev, former Commander of the Volga-Urals Military District. He retired from active duty in October 2011.

Maslov died unexpectedly on 25 December 2022, at the age of 69. His death has been regarded as suspicious.

See also
 2022 Russian businessmen mystery deaths

References

Further  reading 
 Scott & Scott, Russian Military Directory 2004, p. 67
 Biography at peoples.ru 
 Генералы: харьковский биографический словарь / Авт.-сост., вступ.ст. А.В. Меляков, Е.В. Поступная ; Под ред. В.И. Голик, Сергій Іванович Посохов ; Редкол.: В.Г. Бульба, В.Г. Коршунов, Н.А. Олефир, др. . – Харьков : Издательство "Точка", 2013 . – 497 с. : портр. - Библиогр.: с.486-487 (40 назв.) . – На рус. яз. - ISBN 978-617-669-133-4. — С. 274.

1953 births
2022 deaths
Generals of the army (Russia)
Military Academy of the General Staff of the Armed Forces of Russia alumni
Commanders-in-chief of the Russian Army
Recipients of the Order "For Service to the Homeland in the Armed Forces of the USSR", 3rd class
Recipients of the Medal of the Order "For Merit to the Fatherland" II class
People from Sovetsky District, Kursk Oblast